Dead Body is a 2002 short film by Kaz Rahman.

Synopsis
Hassan, a funeral poet, is going through writer's block. Sitting at his desk in a small cramped room with his girlfriend lying on a mattress he leaves for some 'air' – instead he drifts and deviates into much more including an endless procession of chewing gum, a rotund Hungarian 'delivery man' and a sexy Russian woman. Hassan's journey has a metaphysical aspect to it and life in this surreal world is focused on the strange work, anxiety and humour that hovers over death.

Cast
 Husain Naqvi as Hassan
 Ted Hurban as Laszlo
 Katia Ustinova as Sveta
 Jean Burns as Girlfriend
 E. F. Morrill as Dead Body

References

External links
 

2002 films
2002 short films
Canadian drama short films
English-language Canadian films
Films set in New York City
2000s English-language films
2000s Canadian films